Diocese of Dromore can refer to:

Roman Catholic Diocese of Dromore
Diocese of Down and Dromore, Church of Ireland